Alex O'Brien and Jared Palmer were the defending champions but they competed with different partners that year, O'Brien with Sébastien Lareau and Palmer with Byron Black.

Lareau and O'Brien lost in the second round to Mark Knowles and Brian MacPhie.

Black and Palmer lost in the quarterfinals to Jonas Björkman and Todd Woodbridge.

Wayne Ferreira and Yevgeny Kafelnikov won in the final 6–2, 7–5 against Björkman and Woodbridge.

Seeds

Draw

Final

Top half

Bottom half

External links
 2001 Indian Wells Masters Men's Doubles Draw

2001 Indian Wells Masters
Doubles